Bryant Building may refer to:

 Bryant Building (Cleveland), a commercial building in Ohio
 Bryant Building (Kansas City, Missouri), a high-rise office building
 Bryant Building (Manhattan), in New York City